Dialium guianense is a species of tree in the flowering plant family Fabaceae. The species occurs through North America (South Eastern Mexico), Central America and South America, and was an important source of food and wood for the ancient Mayans.

Common names 
In English the common name for this species is ironwood, a name shared with many other plants. In Mexico the common name is Guapaque. In Colombia the common name is Granadillo or Tamarindo de montaña (literally "Mountain tamarind").

Description

It bears a single seeded (rarely, two seeded) edible fruit; the taste is said to be similar to tamarind.

Distribution and habitat 
It is from South America to Central America.

It is native to Belize, Bolivia, Brazil, Colombia, Costa Rica, Ecuador, Guatemala, Guyana, Honduras, Mexico, Nicaragua, Panamá, Peru, Suriname, Venezuela as well as the territory of French Guiana. The species was also introduced to  Cuba and Puerto Rico.

In Suriname the species regularly occurs in humid forests. In Belize the species is abundant in swampy forests but it can also be found in dry areas.

Uses 
The wood from the trees were valued for the construction of railroads, fence posts, and house frames. In Tabasco and Chiapas it's fruit is used for preparing beverages and also some kind of sweet paste with sugar It has also been used for flooring and bridges. In Mexico the tree valued as a source for food.

References 

guianense
Trees of Mexico
Trees of Central America